National Security is a 2012 South Korean prison drama film based on the memoir by Kim Geun-tae, a democracy activist who was kidnapped and tortured by national police inspector Lee Geun-an for 22 days in 1985 during the Chun Doo-hwan regime.

Calling the film "the most painful experience in my 30 years as a filmmaker," director Chung Ji-young wanted the audience to reflect on the theme of torture. He said he found the courage to make the film so that Korean viewers will "engage with our sad history and the sacrifices of great people like Kim Geun-tae in a concrete, meaningful way. If we triumph over the past, we can move forward with unity and reconciliation."

Plot
September 4, 1985. Kim Jong-tae (Park Won-sang), 37, a prominent activist against the military dictatorship of Chun Doo-hwan and onetime commissioner of the Youth Federation for Democracy, is arrested and taken to a special interrogation facility in Namyeong-dong, a district in the center of Seoul synonymous with political torture in the 1970s and 80s because it was the location of the Korean Central Intelligence Agency (KCIA). During the first three days he is allowed no food or sleep and told to write an exhaustive essay on his life to date. On the fourth day, in order to find out why he resigned from the YFD, head interrogator Park Nam-eun (Myung Gye-nam) starts water torture, and on the next day waterboarding. On the sixth day, torture specialist Lee Du-han, known as "The Undertaker" (Lee Geung-young), starts a deadlier form of water torture, trying to get Jong-tae to admit he is a communist in league with North Korea. By the 11th day Jong-tae writes whatever they want him to, but Lee says it's full of inconsistencies and unusable in a court of law. The next day, after finding Jong-tae tried to smuggle out a note to his wife (Woo Hee-jin), Lee resumes a more painful version of water torture, as well as electric shocks.

Cast
Park Won-sang - Kim Jong-tae 
Lee Geung-young - Lee Du-han, "The Undertaker"
Myung Gye-nam - Park Nam-eun
Kim Eui-sung - Kang Su-hyeon
Seo Dong-soo - Section chief Baek
Lee Chun-hee - Section chief Kim
Kim Jung-gi - Section chief Lee
Moon Sung-keun - Director Yoon
Woo Hee-jin - In Jae-eun, Jong-tae's wife

Reception
Many had strong reactions to the film, some even choosing to leave theaters during its screenings at the 17th Busan International Film Festival.

Though it was very strongly reviewed with many critics calling it one of the best Korean films of 2012, its subject matter is believed to have intimidated many viewers, resulting in low box office returns. Director Chung Ji-young said, "It's a low-budget movie, so there wasn't a lot for publicity and marketing, and I think there are limits to its popular appeal. But I also think those 300,000 people went out of their way to see the movie. That's a truly meaningful number for us."

References

External links 

 
 
 

2012 films
2012 biographical drama films
South Korean thriller drama films
South Korean biographical drama films
Biographical films about politicians
Films set in 1985
Films set in Seoul
Films based on biographies
Films directed by Chung Ji-young
2010s Korean-language films
Cultural depictions of activists
Cultural depictions of politicians
Cultural depictions of South Korean men
2012 drama films
South Korean films based on actual events
2010s South Korean films